Donald Duke  (born 30 September 1961 in Calabar) is a Nigerian politician. He was the Governor of Cross River State, Nigeria from 29 May 1999 to 29 May 2007 and the 2019 Nigeria Presidential candidate for Social Democratic Party, SDP.

Personal life and education 
Duke was born to Henry Etim Duke who was the second indigenous (after Ayodele Diyan) and longest serving Controller General of the Nigeria Customs Service (then referred to as Chairman board of Customs and excise duties)

He attended Corona School, Lagos and Federal Government College, Sokoto.

He received his LLB degree in 1982 from Ahmadu Bello University, Zaria - Nigeria, the B.L in 1983 from the Nigerian Law School, Lagos and a L.L.M. in Business Law and Admiralty in 1984 from University of Pennsylvania.

Political career 
Spearheading the incumbent debt of Nigeria, Duke pushed for democracy and against military control. He stated; "What got the military out of power was not democracy but the dreadful state of the economy. If we, the democratic government, cannot deliver food for the mass of people we can forget about democracy."

Duke received praises for his contributions to the fields of agriculture, urban development, government, environment, information and communication, investment drive, and tourism and making Calabar the cleanest city in Nigeria.

He initiated the Obudu Ranch International Mountain Race which attracted contestants and visitors from other countries. In 2005, he created a special reserve fund for the state meant to ‘‘hedge against economic downturn, and the inevitable rainy day’’. This was meant to cushion the effect of unforeseeable economic challenges that may occasion uncertainty in the state's Internally generated revenue, as well as monthly allocation from the federal government.

He also initiated the Calabar Carnival which started in 2004 and is popularly referred to as "Africa's biggest street party."

Duke initiated the Tinapa Resort project as a way to boost business and tourism in the state. Over $350 million was spent on initial development before phase 1 opening in April 2007.
BBC reported in September 2006 that Governor Duke was the only governor specifically mentioned as not being under investigation by the federal Economic and Financial Crimes Commission (Four other governors were also reported as not under investigation but their names were not released.)

Duke announced that he would run for the presidency in the 2007 presidential election, but stepped aside in favour of the eventual winner, Umaru Yar'Adua.

On 8 June 2018, Duke declared interest in running for presidency in 2019.

On Tuesday, 4 September 2018, Duke after much silence as to what party he'll be running under for president, announced that he'll be leaving PDP and run under SDP.

On Monday, 14 June 2021, Duke was officially welcomed back to PDP by the party's leaders after two years of defecting to SDP to join the presidency race. He stated some reasons why he left saying that the party neglected and deviated from some of their core principles and also urged that the party returns to these principles.

See also
List of Governors of Cross River State

References

1961 births
Living people
Governors of Cross River State
People from Calabar
Peoples Democratic Party state governors of Nigeria
People of Efik descent
Nigerian Law School alumni
Efik
Ahmadu Bello University alumni
University of Pennsylvania Law School alumni